Denison Municipal Airport  is a city-owned, public-use airport located two nautical miles (4 km) southwest of the central business district of Denison, a city in Crawford County, Iowa, United States. It is included in the National Plan of Integrated Airport Systems for 2011–2015, which categorized it as a general aviation facility.

Facilities and aircraft 
Denison Municipal Airport covers an area of 205 acres (83 ha) at an elevation of 1,274 feet (388 m) above mean sea level. It has one concrete paved runway designated 12/30 which is 5,000 by 75 feet (1,524 x 23 m) and two turf runways: 18/36 is 2,019 by 105 feet (615 x 32 m) and 6/24 is 1,790 by 178 feet (546 x 54 m).

For the 12-month period ending May 30, 2012, the airport had 6,309 aircraft operations, an average of 17 per day: 97% general aviation, 3% air taxi, and <1% military.
At that time there were 11 aircraft based at this airport: 82% single-engine and 18% multi-engine.

References

External links 
 Denison Municipal Airport at City of Denison website
 Denison Municipal (DNS) at Iowa DOT airport directory
 Aerial image as of October 1994 from USGS The National Map
 

Airports in Iowa
Denison, Iowa
Transportation buildings and structures in Crawford County, Iowa